Burjor Avari (1938-2019) was a teacher of South Asian history and educationist of multicultural education at the Manchester Metropolitan University. He received the honour of MBE in recognition of his work in multicultural education.

Life and career 
Avari was born in India in 1938 and spent his childhood in Kenya and Zanzibar. He graduated in history from the University of Manchester and obtained teacher training from the Oxford University's Institute of Education.

Avari taught history in Kenyan and British schools from 1962 to 1984. He became the team leader for developing multicultural education in the schools of Tameside in 1984. In 1988, he was appointed as a Principal Lecturer at the Manchester Metropolitan University, where he coordinated multicultural education and taught Indian history. He was awarded the title of MBE in 1988 for his work in multicultural education.

Having retired in 2003, Avari holds the position of an Honorary Research Fellow at the Manchester Metropolitan University.

Works 
 Books
 India: The Ancient Past — The History of the Indian Subcontinent from 7000 BC to AD 1200, (Routledge, 2007). .
 Islamic Civilization in South Asia: A history of Muslim power and presence in the Indian subcontinent, (Routledge, 2013). .
 In Praise of Multiculturalism: Defending Diversity, (Manchester Metropolitan University, 2012), . 
 Interwoven World: Ideas and Encounters in History, (co-edited with George Verghese, Common Ground Publishing, Illinois, 2016). .
 Articles
 "An Ethnocentric History of the World: The Case of Paul Johnson", (with George Ghevarghese Joseph), History Workshop, Spring 1987, pp. 112–121. .
 "Race Relations Training: The State of the Art," (with George Gheverghese Joseph),  Peter David Pumfrey, Gajendra K. Verma (eds) Race Relations and Urban Education: Contexts and Promising Practicse, (Psychology Press, 1990). .
 "Becoming British, remaining Indian," in K. N. Malik and Peter Robb (eds) India and Britain: Recent Past and Present Challenges, (Allied Publishers, 1994).

Reception 
Lord Bhikhu Parekh has called Avari's India: The Ancient Past a balanced and well-researched book with lucid exposition. Klaus Karttunen, while noting that Avari is not a professional historian, acknowledges that he has used accounts by good historians for his sources and, when the sources are in disagreement, displays sound judgement in describing them. Muhammad Mughal of Durham University also notes that Avari's account is based on the work of well-known historians. His approach to the Indian subcontinent is termed "holistic," tracing the history of the subcontinent through the geography of regions and culture. Mughal also credits Avari for successfully eliminating the perception that India has been isolated from the rest of the world by describing the inter-cultural communication that has left a mark on India's cultural patterns.

Francis Robinson of Royal Holloway has called Islamic Power in South Asia a story extremely well told. Working in heavily contested areas of history, Avari provides a well-balanced exposition. Muhammad Mughal has welcomed Avari's attempts at exploration of Muslims' history in South Asia and the search for answers to some of the most intriguing questions. His treatment is said to be "innovative, comprehensive and unique in style." Avari finds the sources for his study to be full of biases: those of early Muslim scholars towards their religious ideologies, those of the Anglicist school for its anti-Muslim views and those of Indian and Pakistani historiographies towards their religious and nationalist biases. He uses the recent developments in historical research to draw out reliable information from them. According to Mughal, the book sheds light on the peace-loving and multicultural aspects of South Asian Muslims which are often overlooked in political rhetoric.

References 

2019 deaths
1938 births
Alumni of the University of Manchester
Historians of South Asia
British historians
British educational theorists
Parsi people
Indian expatriates in Kenya
Indian expatriates in Zanzibar
Indian emigrants to the United Kingdom